Legende sau basmele românilor ("Legends or Romanian Fairy-tales") is a collection, in several volumes, of Romanian folktales, first published in 1872 by Petre Ispirescu.

Contents
(note: these are some of the tales)
Tinerețe fără de bătrânețe și viață fără de moarte ("Youth Without Aging and Life Without Death")
Ileana Sânziana
Broasca țestoasă cea fermecată ("The Enchanted Turtle")
Aleodor Împărat ("Emperor Aleodor")
Porcul cel fermecat ("The Enchanted Pig")
Înșiră-te mărgăritari ("Pearls, Thread Yourselves")
Lupul cel năzdrăvan și Făt-Frumos ("The Egregious Wolf and Făt-Frumos")
Prâslea cel voinic și merele de aur ("Prâslea the Brave and the Golden Apples")
Voinicul cel cu cartea în mână născut ("The Hale Born with A Book in His Hands")
Făt-Frumos cu părul de aur ("Făt-Frumos with the Golden Hair")
Zâna munților ("Zâna of the Mountains")
Balaurul cel cu șapte capete ("The Seven-Headed Balaur")
Zâna zânelor ("The Fairies' Fairy")
Greuceanu
Cele douăsprezece fete de împărat și palatul cel fermecat ("The Twelve Daughters of the Emperor and the Enchanted Palace")
Cei trei frați împărați ("The Three Emperor Brothers")
Pasărea măiastră ("The Enchanted Bird")
Hoțu împărat ("The Thief Emperor")
Luceafărul de zi și Luceafărul de noapte ("The Morning Luceafăr and the Evening Luceafăr")
Împăratul șerpilor ("The Emperor of the Snakes")
Sufletul ("The Soul")
Întâmplările lui Păcală ("The Adventures of Păcală")
Împăratul cel fără de lege ("The Lawless Emperor")
Sarea in bucate ("Salt in Dishes")
Omul de piatră ("The Man of Stone")

References

External links
 Folktales at Wikisource 

1874 books
Collections of fairy tales
Romanian fairy tales